White Rapids may refer to:

Places
White Rapids, New Brunswick, a settlement in Canada
Valkeakoski (Finnish: White Rapids), a town and municipality in Finland.

Other
Ingalls, White Rapids and Northern Railway, see List of Michigan railroads
White Rapids Mine, see List of coal mines and landmarks in the Nanaimo area
White Rapids Hydroelectric dam, a dam on the Menominee River

See also
Whitewater
Rapids